Non dirlo al mio capo ("Don't Tell My Boss") is an Italian TV series, co-produced by Rai Fiction and Lux Vide, which was broadcast in Italy between April and May 2016.

Plot 
Naples. Lisa Marcelli is a young widow that is looking for a job and she does everything she can to find one. Fortunately she finds a job as junior litigator in the law firm of Enrico Vinci, a fascinating man but with a bad temper. She doesn't tell him that she has two kids because she knows that otherwise she would lose her job. At the law firm, Marta (a criminal lawyer) is jealous of her because she wants to marry Enrico.

Production

Location 
The TV series was filmed in Santa Marinella (Rome) and Naples.

References 

Italian comedy television series
Italian legal television series